Alfriston College is a secondary school in the suburb of Alfriston in Auckland, New Zealand.

The College opened in 2004, and along with Botany Downs Secondary College, was the first state secondary school to be built in Auckland in 25 years (the last was Macleans College in 1980). It opened with year 9 students and expanded to cover more senior classes each year as the original students aged. From 2008, all secondary years (9–13) have been taught.

Notable alumni

 Jordan Taufua – rugby union player

Notes

Secondary schools in Auckland
Educational institutions established in 2004
2004 establishments in New Zealand